Janjgava or Janjghava is a Georgian (Mingrelian) surname, which may refer to:

Giorgi Janjgava, Ambassador of Georgia in Saudi Arabia
Lasha Janjgava (born 1970), Georgian chess grandmaster
Natia Janjgava (born 1972), Georgian chess master
Nikoloz Janjgava (born 1970), Georgian military officer
Vladimir Janjgava (1907–1982), Soviet general

Georgian-language surnames